Amblyseius solus is a species of mite in the family Phytoseiidae.

References

solus
Articles created by Qbugbot
Animals described in 1981